Sar may refer to:

 Sar, East Azerbaijan
 Sar, Isfahan
 Sar, Kuhpayeh, Isfahan Province
 Sar, Semnan
 Sar, Sistan and Baluchestan